King's Quest II: Romancing the Throne is the second installment in the King's Quest series of graphic adventure games by Sierra On-Line. It was originally released in 1985 for PC DOS/PCjr, and later made available for the Apple II/IIGS, Atari ST, and Amiga. It uses the same AGI game engine as King's Quest I: Quest for the Crown and features King Graham as the player character. The title is a spoof of the 1984 film Romancing the Stone.

Gameplay

King's Quest II resembles King's Quest I in appearance and interface.  Like in King's Quest I, the game world has 'wrap around' allowing player to travel infinitely in the directions of the north or south (The King's Quest Companion which represented a novelized walkthrough explains that the western side of Kolyma folds back upon itself to both the north and south, forever bringing travelers back to where they started). This was the first King's Quest to include an introduction cutscene, just past the credits. It also is the first game in the series with a linear story progression. The world actually changes as the story progresses, new characters appear in the world, areas are opened up to the player, and closed off when no longer needed.

Puzzles involve trading these or using these items to receive new items or to get past obstacles, allowing the player to progress. The game in general honors non-violent solutions, offering more points for them. Many puzzles have more than one solution, but only one optimum solution to earn maximum points. Alternate solutions will net less points or in some cases cause the player to lose points. Examples of alternate solutions are taking more violent approach to getting past an obstacle such as killing or stealing. Some choices may lead to dead ends or death.

All puzzles in the game are solved through a parser. The player may type a phrase with a verb and noun, for example 'Look at' or 'Pick up', the word list in the parser is fairly robust and understands quite a lot of non-important verbs which will result in unexpected replies. For example, the player could type, 'dig', or 'dig the beach' and receive messages about how pointless it is to be digging. Sometimes even illogical verb/noun combinations will net unique comments, such as typing 'Pick up horse' will mention that the flying steed is too fast to catch. With this system the player is able to collect many items using 'pick up' placed into the games inventory. The items in the inventory have close up pictures giving an idea what the item looks like, or in some cases offering clues about the item. In a rare few examples an item may be manipulated in some way.

Plot
Having killed the evil Dahlia and retrieved the three stolen treasures of Daventry, Sir Graham became the new king of Daventry. The mirror shows him a vision about a beautiful young woman, Valanice, in captivity on the top of an ivory crystal tower. Being charmed by her, King Graham travels to the world of Kolyma to rescue Valanice. There he must travel through sea, air, and even death to gain the keys that unlock the three doors to the enchanted island where the witch Hagatha has imprisoned Valanice. After meeting legendary figures such as Neptune, Little Red Riding Hood and Count Dracula, the latter of whom he kills, Graham rescues Valanice. At the end of the game, they are married in a ceremony attended by many of Graham's friends and several of his former enemies.

Development
Limited floppy space would have restricted the design, but Sierra On-Line had been compressing the pictures by drawing them as lines and fill colors for a while. The original version for PC DOS/PCjr does not support sound cards or mice, as they did not exist at the time of publication. That scheme was kept all the way up to King's Quest IV. This sequel to the original King's Quest provided not just a second look at the life of King (formerly Sir) Graham of Daventry, it also began a tradition of using King's Quest as a training ground for future designers. Future Space Quest series designers Scott Murphy and Mark Crowe joined the development team. They helped to make the game an even bigger hit than the original.

According to the series; main designer and writer, Roberta Williams:

King's Quest II contains 14 musical selections, including Tchaikovsky's love theme from Romeo and Juliet. Other tracks include Greensleeves on the title screen, Bach's Toccata and Fugue in D minor in Dracula's castle, and Michael Jackson's Thriller when encountering the ghosts outside the castle entrance (only the opening bars of the last are played so Sierra would not have to pay royalties for using the song). The music for the game was produced by Al Lowe, who was an accomplished jazz musician.

Release
The game was first released in 1985 on a self-booting disk that supported CGA, PCjr, and Tandy graphic cards (as opposed to King's Quest I, which had separate versions for all three) in 1985 as a disk that booted on start-up. Sierra included several modifications to the AGI engine for compatibility with the IBM AT and EGA cards, which had been introduced since King's Quest I was released. The copy protection used on King's Quest I proved to be incompatible with the AT BIOS, so a different scheme was used. Color palette selection in CGA mode was changed to utilize the BIOS instead of modifying the palette register directly. The game engine was also changed to utilize the PC's timer chip instead of a CPU-based speed loop which would result in the game running too fast on the AT.

It was re-released in 1987 with EGA and Hercules support to run under DOS. It was also released on Apple IIGS version with improved soundtrack and sound effects. Sierra's hint book for the game was written by Al Lowe, the game's composer and the creator of the Leisure Suit Larry series.

The manual contains a prologue short story by Annette Childs. The story covers Graham being told by the spirit of the former King Edward in the magic mirror that he must find a wife, or suffer the same fate of the kingdom as he had. Graham calls upon his prime minister Gerwain to prepare a great feast, and call all the maidens and ladies throughout the land. None of the ladies interest the king, and he is left solemn. The magic mirror activates telling him about young maiden Valanice trapped in a tower by the evil witch Hagatha. He is told he must travel to land of Kolyma to find the magic doorway that leads to the enchanted realm.

A novelization of the game is included in The King's Quest Companion which expands the details of story. It was written from the perspective of Daventry's prime minister, Gerwain (mentioned in the KQ2 manual). The first and second editions of the Companion also included articles within An Encyclopedia of Daventry (Abridged), which gave backstories for various characters and locations from the game. More back history about Kolyma can be found in the chapter, "The World of Daventry" in all editions.

Version history:
1.0W: AGI1 version
1.1H: AGI1 version (1985): A PCjr/Tandy/PC version of the game.
2.1 (04-10-1987): This is the version that is included in most copies of the King's Quest Collection. It has the disk-based copy protection removed. Uses AGI2.
2.2 (05-07-1987): This version is associated with the Amiga release. There are two sub-versions one uses interpreter 2.426 and the other uses 2.917. Uses AGI2.

Reception
King's Quest received positive reviews upon release, including an almost-perfect score of 39/40 from ASM. Neil Shapiro from II Computing wrote: "The artists who have brought to life the vision of designer Roberta Williams and story author Annette Childs deserve much recognition. The artwork and animation is almost Disney-like in quality and execution."

Remakes

Sierra remake (cancelled)
In 1990 the developers at Sierra redeveloped King's Quest with a new interface and up-to-date technology. The plan was to redevelop King's Quest II but due to rather disappointing sales of the 1990 remake of King's Quest I, the prospect of officially remaking and re-releasing King's Quest II was scrapped.

Fan remake
In 2002, AGD Interactive, then known as Tierra Entertainment, released an unofficial remake of King's Quest II under a fan license by Vivendi, known as King's Quest II: Romancing the Stones. In 2009, AGD Interactive released version 3.0, featuring redrawn backgrounds and dialogue pictures; the voice-acting was also dramatically improved and, thanks to fan feedback, many problems were attended to.

The remake uses a point-and-click interface functionally identical to an advanced SCI game engine, VGA graphics and digital sound, including full speech for all characters. Notably for an unofficial, fan-made project, the game's protagonist King Graham is voiced by Josh Mandel, who also voiced the part in Sierra's official CD-ROM full-speech versions of King's Quest V and VI. In contrast to the group's remake of King's Quest I, a content-wise identical presentation upgrade, King's Quest II+ redesigns the original game by adding a rewritten plot expanding on the 1985 version (although it changes several points of the plot, 'Dracula' is now a good guy, and the 'Monk' is a bad guy, several characters removed), a number of puzzles, new characters and locations including a town, and references to the later King's Quest games.

King's Quest Chapter 3
The third chapter of 2015's King's Quest, titled Once Upon a Climb, is a reimagined retelling of the rescue of Valanice from Hagatha's tower from King's Quest II.

References

Bibliography

External links

King's Quest II technical help at the Sierra Help Pages

1980s interactive fiction
1985 video games
Adventure games
Point-and-click adventure games
Amiga games
Apple IIGS games
Atari ST games
DOS games
Games commercially released with DOSBox
King's Quest
ScummVM-supported games
Sierra Entertainment games
Video game sequels
Video games about witchcraft
Video games scored by Al Lowe
Video games developed in the United States